185 (one hundred [and] eighty-five) is the natural number following 184 and preceding 186.

In mathematics
There are 185 different directed graphs on four unlabeled vertices that have at least one sink vertex, with no outgoing edges, 185 ways of permuting the squares of a  grid of squares in such a way that each square is one unit away from its original position horizontally, vertically, or diagonally, and 185 matroids on five labeled elements in which each element participates in at least one basis.

The Spiral of Theodorus is formed by unit-length line segments that, together with the center point of the spiral, form right triangles. 185 of these right triangles fit within the first four turns of this spiral.

See also
 The year AD 185 or 185 BC
 List of highways numbered 185

References

Integers